King of Noise (Korean: 소음의 왕; RR: Soeumeui Wang) is an extended play (EP) by South Korean folktronica band Electron Sheep. It was released on September 30, 2015. The album is the first album when Electron Sheep became a band.

The album was released to high critical acclaim. Weiv ranked it 8th in its Korean Albums of the Year 2015 list.

Track listing
All music written by Electron Sheep.

References

2015 EPs
Electron Sheep albums
Korean-language EPs